Podymovka is a rural locality in Soldatsky Selsoviet Rural Settlement, Fatezhsky District, Kursk Oblast, Russia. The population as of 2010 is 13.

Geography 
The village is located on the Radubezhsky Brook (a link tributary of the Usozha in the basin of the Svapa), 86 km from the Russia–Ukraine border, 53 km north-west of Kursk, 17 km south-west of the district center – the town Fatezh, 9.5 km from the selsoviet center – Soldatskoye.

Climate
Podymovka has a warm-summer humid continental climate (Dfb in the Köppen climate classification).

Transport 
Podymovka is located 15 km from the federal route  Crimea Highway as part of the European route E105, 6 km from the road of regional importance  (Fatezh – Dmitriyev), 9.5 km from the road  (Konyshyovka – Zhigayevo – 38K-038), 6.5 km from the road of intermunicipal significance  (38K-038 – Soldatskoye – Shuklino), 4 km from the road  (38N-679 – Verkhniye Khalchi), on the road  (38N-681 – Podymovka – Proletarovka), 23 km from the nearest railway halt Mitsen (railway line Arbuzovo – Luzhki-Orlovskiye).

The rural locality is situated 56.5 km from Kursk Vostochny Airport, 168 km from Belgorod International Airport and 250 km from Voronezh Peter the Great Airport.

References

Notes

Sources

Rural localities in Fatezhsky District